In the rabbit (Oryctolagus cuniculus), lethal dwarfism occurs in individuals homozygous for the dwarf allele (dwdw). Homozygosity for the dwarf allele results in a lethal autosomal recessive mutation. This is caused by a loss of function (LOF) mutation in the High mobility AT-hook 2 (HMGA2) gene, spanning 12.1Kb from 44,709,089 bp to 44,721,236 bp that removes the gene promotor as well as multiple exons. This mutation greatly affects growth of homozygous embryos (resulting in stunted size and altered craniofacial development) and homozygous kits once born. These individuals homozygous for the dwarf allele are viable in the womb but die days after being born. Individuals that are heterozygous for the dwarf allele are healthy and unaffected by the lethality of the mutation, but are smaller than individuals homozygous for the wild type allele.

Dwarf rabbits 
Domestication of rabbits originated in the Catholic monasteries of Southern France around 500-600 AD. Species believed to have been present in the region were Oryctolagus cuniculus cuniculus and O. c. algirus, native to the Iberian Peninsula, as well as O. c. cuniculus, a species native to France. At this point in time, rabbits were mainly being raised for meat, and therefore, a larger, bulkier rabbit was preferred. It was not until much later that rabbits solely as pets gained popularity, and as they did, breeding for smaller size became more prevalent.

Today, dwarf rabbits are largely popular and nine different breeds are accepted by the American Rabbit Breeder’s Association (ARBA) with many others accepted in other countries. These breeds vary greatly in characteristics but they all have the dwarf allele in common.  Small non-dwarf breeds, though they can be a similar weight to dwarfs, do not carry the dwarf allele and thus do not produce "peanuts" (dwdw kits) in their litters. Though size of dwarf and small non-dwarf rabbit breeds may be similar, dwarfs have features unique to them. Dwarf rabbits have characteristically large, blocky heads that appear disproportional to their small, rounded bodies, with short noses and short, thick ears, allowing them to stand apart from other breeds in their proportions alone.

Dwarf allele 
Dwarfs owe their small size and features to both the dwarf allele (dw) and selective breeding, where rabbits are selected by humans for their characteristics, resulting in more offspring of the desired characteristic. Rabbits possessing two copies of the wild type allele (Dw/Dw) are larger than their other dwarf littermates, but these individuals that are homozygous for the wild type allele are still smaller that standard sized rabbits. This is because of selective breeding over the years selecting for a smaller size. Individuals heterozygous for the dwarf allele (Dw/dw) are what we typically think of as dwarfs. These are the individuals that are most often seen representing their breed because they more easily fit into weight requirements for competitions. They are about 2/3 the size of their homozygous wild type allele littermates. Because of this, we see the dwarf allele greatly contributes to the small size of dwarfs, but it is also a lethal autosomal recessive mutation. Kits (rabbit young) homozygous for the dwarf allele (dwdw) are often referred to as "peanuts", and although viable up to birth, die days afterwards. Physically, they differ greatly from their healthy littermates and differentiation is possible at birth. Peanuts are significantly smaller than their healthy littermates (about 1/3 the size of a healthy kit) and often possess swollen heads and smaller than normal ears. They also have been reported to have incompletely calcified calvariums, adding to deformity of their skulls. Peanuts exhibit a greatly decreased growth rate, and although it has been reported that some are capable of nursing, they are quickly left behind in growth and weight by their healthy littermates as they appear to not be growing at all. Peanuts are a common occurrence in dwarf litters, with there being a 1/4 chance of a kit being a peanut if both parents are heterozygous for the dwarf allele. There have been multiple reports of different organ systems being negatively affected by the peanut phenotype, including inhibition of the endocrine system at the pituitary. This could in part explain the inhibition of growth in dwdw kits.

The dwarf allele has been shown to have a genetic linkage with the Agouti gene, pointing to its presence on chromosome 4. Location of the dwarf allele on chromosome 4 has been confirmed through heterozygosity mapping.

Causal mutation for Dwarf allele 
The causal mutation for the dwarf allele has been found to be a 12.1Kb deletion from 44,709,089 bp to 44,721,236 bp in the high mobility AT-hook 2 (HMGA2) gene (also known as HMGI-C). This deletion mutation removes the promoter as well as the first three exons of the gene, rendering it inactivated. This results in the gene being “knocked out” and rendered nonfunctional.

High mobility AT-hook 2 (HMGA2) is an architectural transcription factor, a protein complex that mediates structure of interactions between DNA and protein and facilitates contact between DNA sequences within the genome. Essentially, HMGA2 regulates transcription' HMGA2 belongs to a family of non-histone chromatin proteins. HMGA2 has associations with body size in humans, mice, dogs, and horses. Research has also shown beak size in different species of Darwin’s finches correlate with a genomic region containing HMGA2, adding to its associations with size across a wide number of species.

In rabbits, HMGA2 regulates growth of embryos and has been associated with mitochondrial function. HMGA2 is also required for normal IGF2BP2 expression. IGF2BP2 is an RNA binding protein that affects the translation of many different RNAs.

References

Wikipedia Student Program
Genetic diseases and disorders
Rabbit diseases
Rabbots